The 2020–21 Iowa State Cyclones women's basketball team represented Iowa State University during the 2020–21 NCAA Division I women's basketball season. The Cyclones were coached by Bill Fennelly, who was in his 26th season at Iowa State. They played their home games at Hilton Coliseum in Ames, Iowa as members of the Big 12 Conference.

Previous season

The Cyclones finished the 2019–20 season 18–11, 10–8 in Big 12 play to finish in tie for fourth place. The Big 12 Tournament, NCAA women's basketball tournament and WNIT were all cancelled before they began due to the COVID-19 pandemic.

Roster

Schedule and results
Source:

|-
!colspan=6 style=| Regular Season

|-
!colspan=6 style=| Big 12 Tournament

|-
!colspan=6 style=| NCAA Women's Tournament

Rankings

Coaches' Poll did not release a second poll at the same time as the AP.

See also
2020–21 Iowa State Cyclones men's basketball team

References

Iowa State Cyclones women's basketball seasons
Iowa State
Iowa State Cyclones
Iowa State Cyclones
Iowa State